Mylothris mafuga is a butterfly in the family Pieridae. It is found in the Democratic Republic of Congo (eastern Kivu) and western Uganda. The habitat consists of forests and forest margins.

References

Butterflies described in 1981
Pierini